USA-293, also known as GPS-III SV02 or Magellan, is a United States navigation satellite which forms part of the Global Positioning System. It was the second GPS Block III satellite to be launched.

Satellite 
SV02 is the second GPS Block III satellite to be launched. Ordered in 2008, technical delays to the first satellite in the program, SV01, pushed launch back to 2019.

Launch 
USA-293 was launched by United Launch Alliance on 22 August 2019 at 13:06 UTC atop a Delta IV Medium. The launch was the final flight of the single-core Delta IV, with all subsequent flights being on the triple-core Delta IV Heavy. The launch took place from Cape Canaveral Space Launch Complex 37, and deployed USA-293 directly into a semi-synchronous orbit.

Orbit 

References 

Spacecraft launched in 2019
GPS satellites
USA satellites
Spacecraft launched by Delta rockets